is a former Japanese football player and manager. He played for Japan national team. He also former president of Japan Football Association.

Club career
Daini was born in Kobe on October 12, 1944. After graduating from Keio University, he joined Mitsubishi Motors in 1970. The club won the league champions in 1973 and 1978. The club won 1971, 1973, 1978 Emperor's Cup and 1978 JSL Cup. He retired in 1978. He played 119 games and scored 1 goal in the league. He was selected Best Eleven in 1973.

National team career
On July 12, 1972, Daini debuted for Japan national team against Khmer. In 1974, he was selected Japan for 1974 Asian Games. He also played at 1974 World Cup qualification and 1976 Summer Olympics qualification. He played 44 games for Japan until 1976.

Coaching career
After retirement, Daini became a manager for Mitsubishi Motors as Kenzo Yokoyama successor in 1984. He led the club to won the 3rd place for 2 years in a row (1986-1988). However, in 1989, the club was relegated to Division 2 first time in club history and he resigned.

From 1992, Daini worked at Japan Football Association. He served as vice-president (2006-2012) and president (2012-2016).

Club statistics

National team statistics

References

External links
 
 Japan National Football Team Database

1944 births
Living people
Keio University alumni
Association football people from Hyōgo Prefecture
Japanese footballers
Japan international footballers
Japan Soccer League players
Urawa Red Diamonds players
Footballers at the 1974 Asian Games
Japanese football managers
Association football defenders
Asian Games competitors for Japan
20th-century Japanese people
Presidents of the Japan Futsal Federation